"Thinkin' About You" is a song written by Tom Shapiro and Bob Regan, and recorded by American country music artist Trisha Yearwood. It was released in January 1995 as the second single and title track from her album Thinkin' About You. The song became Yearwood's third number-one country hit in April 1995. Lee Roy Parnell plays slide guitar on the song.

Critical reception
Billboard gave the single a favorable review, praising Yearwood's vocal delivery and Parnell's guitar work, and overall saying that it was "a cut above" her previous singles.

Music video
The music video was directed by Gerry Wenner and premiered in early 1995.

Chart performance

Year-end charts

References

1995 singles
1994 songs
Trisha Yearwood songs
Songs written by Tom Shapiro
Songs written by Bob Regan
Song recordings produced by Garth Fundis
MCA Records singles